Nicole Zefanya (born 24 January 1999), known professionally as NIKI, (stylized in all uppercase), is an Indonesian songwriter and record producer. She is currently based in the United States and signed with the record label 88rising.

Early life
Zefanya was born on 24 January 1999 and raised in Jakarta, Indonesia.

At nine years old, Zefanya taught herself how to play the guitar. At 13, she began writing original music. Although her music is partially influenced by her mother, who exposed Zefanya to soul, gospel, and 1990s' R&B like Destiny's Child and Aaliyah when she was young, Zefanya's earliest original music skewed towards the folk and indie genres.

She attended Pelita Harapan School and obtained a high school degree before pursuing an undergraduate degree in music at Lipscomb University in Nashville, Tennessee on a scholarship.

Career 
At 15, she was the opening act for Taylor Swift's The Red Tour in Jakarta after winning a competition arranged by Swift and the ice-cream brand Walls, called Ride to Fame. Zefanya maintained a YouTube channel throughout her teenage years, which gained over 40,000 subscribers. She uploaded many original songs and covers, most of them stolen/stripped, including ballads "Polaroid Boy" (2016) and "Anaheim" (2017), which were eventually released and on Spotify under Nicole Zefanya.

In 2017, Zefanya moved to Nashville, Tennessee to study music at Lipscomb University. She released two singles, "See U Never" and "I Like U" under the American mass media company 88rising as an artist under their label. She released the song "Vintage" in May 2018 as the first single for her debut extended play titled Zephyr.

Zefanya has stated that she tries to empower Asians and African Americans through her music. In the first Head in the Clouds Festival, NIKI took a moment to address the 10,000-plus audience gathered in Los Angeles' Historic State Park. "I just want to say, as an Asian female, I do not take this day and this stage for granted. My hope is that above everything else today, that you feel heard, you feel understood, but most of all that you feel represented." NIKI's mission is to empower young Asian artists under-represented in the American music industry.

After 88rising announced their collaboration with popular food festival 626 Night Market to curate a food section at their second "Head in the Clouds" music festival, Zefanya made a special guest appearance with a meet-and-greet at the 626 Night Market event at Santa Anita Park in Arcadia, California on 11 August 2019.

In September 2020, Zefanya released her debut album Moonchild. In an interview she was quoted saying,In terms of genre or sound, I wouldn't even know how to describe this album. It doesn't really fit into any box and I'm completely ok with that. I personally love projects like that – ones that push boundaries and don't adhere to any convention. Music is expressive; it's art. Formulas get old and boring. I think that's how this project differs from my past projects. I sort of just let go of any and all preconceived notions, rules and limitations I had in my head and just let my creativity take the wheel in any direction.In December 2020, Zefanya dropped "Hallway Weather", a holiday single reminiscent of her folk/indie roots. She says the song is in "the style of music & songwriting [she remembers] feeling most like [herself]. It is genuine & it is true."

Zefanya was involved with five tracks for the soundtrack of the 2021 film Shang-Chi and the Legend of the Ten Rings.

In July 2022, Zefanya's sophomore self-titled album 'Nicole' was confirmed to be released in August, which was available for pre-save and pre-orders via her website. The tracklist was soon revealed which contained old hits such as 'Anaheim' and 'Milk Teeth' from her now deleted YouTube channel 'Nzee24'. The album was officially released worldwide on 12ᵗʰ August 2022.

Artistry 
Zefanya's music was influenced by her favorite pop, folk, R&B and indie artists, including Taylor Swift, Boyz II Men, Destiny's Child, Mariah Carey, Whitney Houston, Kirk Franklin, and Aaliyah. She grew up very exposed to music as her mother sang church gospel music as a backup singer. Zefanya has been exploring new sounds outside R&B since the release of her debut album Moonchild. She has also said that she listens to and is influenced by all kinds of music. She cites growing up in Indonesia as influencing her worldview, and in turn, her music.

Discography

Studio albums

Live albums

Extended plays

Singles

Guest appearances

Tour

Headlining 
 The Nicole Tour - NIKI (2022)

Opening act 
Taylor Swift – The Red Tour (Jakarta) (2014)
Rich Brian – Australia & New Zealand Tour (2018)
Halsey – Hopeless Fountain Kingdom Tour (Asia) (2018)

Awards and nominations
The MTV Europe Music Awards (originally named MTV European Music Awards, commonly abbreviated as MTV EMA) are awards presented by Paramount International Networks to honour artists and music in pop culture.

See also

 Rich Brian
 Stephanie Poetri

Notes

References

External links

 
 
 

Living people
1999 births
21st-century Indonesian women singers
Indonesian contemporary R&B singers
English-language singers from Indonesia
Musicians from Jakarta
Indonesian expatriates in the United States